The 1979–80 NBA season was the Hawks' 31st season in the NBA and 12th season in Atlanta.

Offseason

Draft picks

Roster

Regular season

Season standings

z - clinched division title
y - clinched division title
x - clinched playoff spot

Record vs. opponents

Game log

Playoffs

|- align="center" bgcolor="#ffcccc"
| 1
| April 6
| @ Philadelphia
| L 104–107
| Eddie Johnson (26)
| Dan Roundfield (13)
| Eddie Johnson (6)
| Spectrum10,561
| 0–1
|- align="center" bgcolor="#ffcccc"
| 2
| April 9
| @ Philadelphia
| L 92–99
| Dan Roundfield (23)
| Dan Roundfield (14)
| three players tied (3)
| Spectrum18,276
| 0–2
|- align="center" bgcolor="#ccffcc"
| 3
| April 10
| Philadelphia
| W 105–93
| Eddie Johnson (19)
| Tree Rollins (17)
| three players tied (6)
| Omni Coliseum15,617
| 1–2
|- align="center" bgcolor="#ffcccc"
| 4
| April 13
| Philadelphia
| L 83–107
| Dan Roundfield (17)
| Dan Roundfield (12)
| three players tied (4)
| Omni Coliseum15,617
| 1–3
|- align="center" bgcolor="#ffcccc"
| 5
| April 15
| @ Philadelphia
| L 100–105
| John Drew (29)
| Dan Roundfield (13)
| Charlie Criss (5)
| Spectrum18,276
| 1–4
|-

Player statistics

Season

Playoffs

Awards and records
Dan Roundfield, All-NBA Second Team
Dan Roundfield, NBA All-Defensive First Team
"Fast Eddie" Johnson, NBA All-Defensive Second Team

Transactions

References

See also
1979-80 NBA season

Atlanta Hawks seasons
Ata
Atlanta Hawks
Atlanta Hawks